Ruth Harris is a scientist at the United States Geological Survey known for her research on large earthquakes, especially on how they begin, end, and cause the ground to shake. In 2019, Harris was elected a fellow of the American Geophysical Union who cited her "for outstanding contributions to earthquake rupture dynamics, stress transfer, and triggering".

Education and career 
Harris has a B.S. from Massachusetts Institute of Technology, and an M.S. from Cornell University (1984). After a few years of working, she came to the University of California, Santa Barbara where she earned a Ph.D. in 1991 working with Ralph Archueta. Following her Ph.D., she was a National Research Council postdoctoral investigator at the United States Geological Survey for two years before she was hired in a permanent position.

In 2015, Harris served as president of the Seismological Society of America.

Research 
Harris's research into earthquakes involves a combination of computer simulations and field and laboratory investigations. She is particularly interested in creeping faults, faults that creep for long periods of time while producing multiple small earthquakes. In California, Harris quantified stress within the Parkfield segment of the San Andreas Fault, estimated changes in stress during the 1992 Landers earthquake, and tracked the impact of the 1857 Fort Tejon earthquake on subsequent earthquakes in the region. She has simulated the movement of fractures across multiple segments of fault plans, and considered the role of earthquake depth and soil type in determining the strength of earthquakes such as the 2017 Puebla earthquake. Harris led the community effort to validate computer models of earthquakes with field-based verification efforts.

Selected publications

Awards and honors 
Meritorious Service Award, United States Department of the Interior (2011)
Distinguished Alumna Award, University of California, Santa Barbara Department of Earth Science (2016)
Fellow, American Geophysical Union (2019)

References

External links 
 

Massachusetts Institute of Technology alumni
Cornell University alumni
University of California, Santa Barbara alumni
United States Geological Survey personnel
Fellows of the American Geophysical Union
Living people
Women geologists
Seismologists
Year of birth missing (living people)